David Peter Wallace (born 8 July 1976) is an Irish retired rugby union player, who played for Munster, Ireland and the British & Irish Lions. He normally played as an openside flanker, but could also play blindside flanker and number 8.

Early life
Wallace grew up in Limerick on Ennis Road, and later lived in Cork. He was educated at Crescent College

Munster
Wallace made his Munster debut against Connacht in August 1997. He made his European debut against Harlequins in September 1997 in the 1997–98 Heineken Cup.

Wallace started for Munster in the 2000 Heineken Cup Final. He scored his side's only try but opponents Northampton Saints eventually won 9–8. Wallace again started for Munster during the 2002 Heineken Cup Final against Leicester Tigers. Once again, Munster lost narrowly, being defeated 15–9.

Injury ruled Wallace out of much of the 2002–03 Celtic League, meaning he missed Munster's victory against Neath that won the league.

His first taste of silverware with Munster came against Scarlets in the Celtic Cup Final in May 2005.

Wallace scored the fourth try in Munster's win over Sale in the 2005–06 Heineken Cup to take the Irish province into a home quarter-final against USA Perpignan. After defeating Perpignan in the quarter final, Munster beat arch-rivals Leinster 30–6 in the semi-final to reach their third Heineken Cup final. At the Millennium Stadium, Munster beat Biarritz Olympique 23–19 to win the 2006 Heineken Cup Final. This was Munster's, and Wallace's, first Heineken Cup Final victory.

Munster, and Wallace, again secured Heineken Cup success when they beat Toulouse 16–13 in the 2008 Heineken Cup Final.

Wallace was part of the Munster team that won the 2008–09 Magners League.

In February 2011, Wallace extended his contract with Munster until the end of the 2011–12 season.

Wallace became the sixth player to reach 200 caps for Munster against Leinster during the 2011 Magners League Grand Final, a game in which he won the Man of the Match award.

Having returned to full training after the knee injury that ruled him out of the 2011 World Cup and 2012 Six Nations, Wallace was named in the Munster squad to travel to Aironi on 7 March 2012. He made his comeback during the game, playing the last 20 minutes. Wallace continued his comeback by playing the first 40 minutes of Munster A's friendly against a Munster Development team on 16 March. He was added to Munster's 2011–12 Heineken Cup squad in March 2012. Wallace made his first appearance in the 2011–12 Heineken Cup season in the quarter-final against Ulster on 8 April 2012. This turned out to be Wallace's last game for Munster, as a recurrence of the knee injury suffered in August 2011 forced him to retire in May 2012.

Ireland
Wallace made his Ireland debut against Argentina on 3 June 2000.

On 10 June 2000, Wallace was part of the Ireland team that recorded their largest win by beating the United States 83–3.

Three lengthy injury-enforced absences hindered Wallace's international development. He only played in five games for Ireland until returning to start in the Triple Crown victory over Scotland in the 2004 Six Nations Championship — scoring a vital try in the process. He started again in both Tests in 2004 against South Africa.
He did not return again to the Irish side until the second Test against Japan in June 2005, where he scored his fourth international try.

His form for Munster saw him earn a recall to the Irish set-up in 2006. He was present during the 2006 Six Nations Championship and the Summer Tour in June.

Wallace scored a try for Ireland in their 43–13 demolition of England in the 2007 Six Nations Championship, and his form saw him selected in Ireland's squad for the 2007 Rugby World Cup in France. He started all four of Ireland's pool games at the tournament.

Wallace was a member of the Irish Grand Slam winning side in 2009.

Wallace kept his place in the Ireland team for the November Tests in 2009, and played a crucial role in the win over South Africa. He played in all 5 of Ireland's 2010 Six Nations Championship games and won the Man-of-the-Match award against Italy. Wallace was in outstanding form for Munster throughout the 2009/10 season, and was selected in Ireland's squad for the summer tour to New Zealand and Australia. He played against New Zealand and came on as a substitute against the New Zealand Maori before returning home for the birth of his second child. He played against South Africa, New Zealand and Argentina during Ireland's 2010 Autumn Tests, and became Ireland's most capped back-row player. Wallace played in all five of Ireland's 2011 Six Nations Championship games, including the 24–8 victory over England at Aviva Stadium that ended England's hopes of a Grand Slam.

Wallace was selected in Ireland's training squad for the 2011 World Cup warm-ups in August, and was also selected in the final 30-man squad. However, a knee injury sustained during Ireland's final warm-up game against England ruled Wallace out of the tournament in New Zealand.

Following the injury, he was ruled out of action for six months, which also ruled Wallace out of the 2012 Six Nations Championship.

British & Irish Lions
Wallace toured Australia with the 2001 British & Irish Lions following in the footsteps of his brothers Richard and Paul. He played against NSW Country Districts, and scored a try against ACT Brumbies.

On 21 April 2009, Wallace was named in the Lions' squad for the tour to South Africa. He started the first and second tests, and came on as a substitute for the third.

Retirement
Wallace announced his retirement from rugby on 3 May 2012, due to the knee injury he suffered in August 2011. Wallace had made a comeback from the injury, but a re-occurrence of the injury forced him to quit the game.

Speaking at the announcement,

"Although it's disappointing that injury is forcing me to retire now, I take great comfort that I've had an unbelievably enjoyable career and I feel very lucky to have been involved in an era that has seen Munster and Ireland enjoy so much success. Professional rugby has exploded in popularity and changed beyond all recognition in this country since I began and I feel honored to have played witness to its massive improvement. I'd like to thank anyone who has helped me and had faith in me during my 15 year professional career including family, teammates, coaches, medics, friends and not least supporters. I will be looking to step away from rugby and explore a few different business opportunities while also looking forward to being able to spend more time with my wife Aileen and sons Andrew and Harvey."

Since his retirement from rugby, Wallace has opened a sweet shop in Limerick.  In 2017 he joined Bank of Ireland as a Business Development Manager for the Munster region.

Statistics

International tries

International analysis by opposition

Correct as of 5 July 2017
* indicates inclusion of caps for British & Irish Lions

Honours

Munster
 European Rugby Champions Cup:
 Winner (2): 2005–06, 2007–08
 United Rugby Championship:
 Winner (3): 2002–03, 2008–09, 2010–11
 Celtic Cup:
 Winner (1): 2004–05
 Irish Interprovincial Rugby Championship:
 Winner (3): 1998–99, 1999–2000, 2000–01

Ireland
 Six Nations Championship:
 Winner (1): 2009
 Grand Slam:
 Winner (1): 2009
 Triple Crown:
 Winner (4): 2004, 2006, 2007, 2009

British & Irish Lions
 British & Irish Lions tours:
 Tourist (2): 2001, 2009

References

External links
Munster Profile
Ireland Profile
British & Irish Lions Profile
Pro14 Profile

1976 births
Living people
People educated at Crescent College
Rugby union players from Limerick (city)
Irish rugby union players
Garryowen Football Club players
Munster Rugby players
Ireland international rugby union players
British & Irish Lions rugby union players from Ireland
Rugby union flankers
Rugby union number eights